Michael "Lufa" Kadosh (April 23, 1940 – April 29, 2014) was an Israeli footballer who also worked as the manager of Hapoel Jerusalem. He died on 29 April 2014 from cancer at the age of 74.

Honours

As a player
Israeli Premier League (3):
1964-65, 1970–71, 1971–72
Israel State Cup (1):
1969

As a manager
Israeli Second Division (2):
1978-79, 2000–01
Toto Cup (Artzit) (1):
1996-97
Israeli Third Division (2):
2007-08, 2010–11

References

1940 births
2014 deaths
Israeli Jews
Egyptian Jews
Israeli footballers
Footballers from Jaffa
Deaths from cancer in Israel
Maccabi Jaffa F.C. players
Maccabi Ramat Amidar F.C. players
Maccabi Netanya F.C. players
Maccabi Tel Aviv F.C. players
Hakoah Ramat Gan F.C. managers
Maccabi Ramat Amidar F.C. managers
Maccabi Yavne F.C. managers
Hapoel Ashkelon F.C. managers
Shimshon Tel Aviv F.C. managers
Maccabi Sha'arayim F.C. managers
Beitar Jerusalem F.C. managers
Beitar Tel Aviv F.C. managers
Hapoel Be'er Sheva F.C. managers
Hapoel Kfar Saba F.C. managers
Maccabi Herzliya F.C. managers
Bnei Sakhnin F.C. managers
Maccabi Ahi Nazareth F.C. managers
Hapoel Jerusalem F.C. managers
Israeli Premier League managers
Sportspeople from Alexandria
Egyptian emigrants to Israel
Association football goalkeepers
Israeli football managers